The Shire of Antigua is a former local government area in the Wide Bay–Burnett area of Queensland, Australia, centred on the town of Yengarie. It existed between 1879 and 1917.

History
On 11 November 1879, the Antigua Division was created as one of 74 divisions within Queensland under the Divisional Boards Act 1879 with a population of 1636.

With the passage of the Local Authorities Act 1902, the Antigua Division became the Shire of Antigua on 31 March 1903.

The Shire of Antigua was abolished on 15 Feb 1917 and divided between the Shire of Burrum and the Shire of Woocoo  (which was created in part from Shire of Tinana in 1914).

Chairmen

 1910-11: J. Mahoney

References

External links
 

Former local government areas of Queensland
1879 establishments in Australia
1917 disestablishments in Australia